A dessert spoon is a spoon designed specifically for eating dessert and sometimes used for soup or cereals. Similar in size to a soup spoon (intermediate between a teaspoon and a tablespoon) but with an oval rather than round bowl, it typically has a capacity around twice that of a teaspoon. 

By extension, the term 'dessert spoon' is used as a cooking measure of volume, usually of 10ml or  fl oz.

Dining
The use of dessert spoons around the world varies greatly; in some areas they are very common, while in other places the use of the dessert spoon is almost unheard of—with diners using forks or teaspoons for their desserts instead.

In most traditional table settings, the dessert spoon is placed above the plate or bowl, separated from the rest of the cutlery, or it may simply be brought in with the dessert.

Culinary measure
As a unit of culinary measure, a level dessertspoon (dstspn.) equals 2 teaspoons. In the UK it is 10 ml.

Apothecary measure
As a unit of Apothecary measure, the dessert-spoon was an unofficial but widely used unit of fluid measure equal to two fluid drams, or  fluid ounce. However, even when approximated, its use was discouraged: "Inasmuch as spoons vary greatly in capacity, and from their form are unfit for use in the dosage of medicine, it is desirable... to be measured with a suitable medicine measure."

In both the British and American variants of the Apothecaries' system, two tea-spoons make a dessert-spoon, while two dessert-spoons make a table-spoon.

See also
 Cooking weights and measures
 Teaspoon
 Tablespoon

Sources

External links

 Silver place settings, from Butler's Guild

Spoons
Units of volume
Alcohol measurement

Cooking weights and measures
Customary units of measurement in the United States